Joanna Mary Gideon is a British Conservative Party politician, who has been the Member of Parliament (MP) for Stoke-on-Trent Central constituency since the 2019 general election.

Early life and career 
Gideon studied at Stourbridge High School, and then earned a degree (BA Hons in German) from the University of Birmingham. She has worked in higher education as a small business owner: she ran a business importing and selling handmade paper.

Political career 
Gideon contested the marginal seat of Scunthorpe at the 2015 general election, but lost to the Labour incumbent, Nic Dakin. At the 2017 general election, she stood in another marginal seat, Great Grimsby, and finished 2,565 votes behind Labour's sitting MP, Melanie Onn. Gideon was elected to Ashford Borough Council in May 2019 as a borough councillor, where she was a cabinet member for Community Safety & Wellbeing. She stood down as councillor following her election to Parliament in December 2019, when she narrowly gained Stoke-on-Trent Central from Labour for the Conservatives, it being the third marginal seat she had stood for election in.

She has also worked as an aide to Damian Green, former Cabinet minister and MP for Ashford since 1997.

On 9 February 2023, she announced she would be standing down at the next general election. She is the second so-called  red wall MP to do so, after Dehenna Davison in Bishop Auckland.

Personal life 
Gideon was previously married, she has two sons, and a daughter, actress Ingrid Oliver. She lists her recreations as "theatre, travel, family".

References

External links

 https://www.politicshome.com/thehouse/article/class-of-2019-meet-the-new-mps

Living people
UK MPs 2019–present
Conservative Party (UK) MPs for English constituencies
21st-century British women politicians
Alumni of the University of Birmingham
Conservative Party (UK) councillors
Councillors in Kent
Female members of the Parliament of the United Kingdom for English constituencies
People from Birmingham, West Midlands
21st-century English women
21st-century English people
Women councillors in England
1952 births